Xueyuanqiao station is a subway station on the Changping line of the Beijing Subway. It opened on 4 February 2023.

Layout
The station has an underground island platform. There are 5 exits, lettered A, B, C1, C2 and D1. Exit B is accessible via an elevator.

Station Art
There is a mural named 'Flowers Smile at Me' in the east of the station hall, which shows the images of science students who look the same but have their own unique spiritual outlook. The three entrances and exits of A, C, and D are arranged differently according to the adjacent colleges with different murals. The mural 'Geological Era' is arranged at the passageway of Exit A near China University of Geosciences (Beijing), and the mural 'Vision of Love' with 'health' as the starting point is installed at the passageway of Exit C near Peking University Health Science Center. At the passageway of Exit D leading to the Beijing University of Aeronautics and Astronautics, a mural is decorated as a 'tunnel connecting the universe and the future'. It is called 'Dream Space Station'.

Gallery

References 

Beijing Subway stations in Haidian District